Matthew W. Kmosko (born January 8, 1972 in Ship Bottom, New Jersey) is a former U.S. soccer defender who played three and a half season in Major League Soccer.  He also earned three caps with the U.S. national team in 1992.

High school and college
Kmosko attended Southern Regional High School in Ocean County, New Jersey.  He graduated in 1990 and entered Hartwick College.  Kmosko played on the Hartwick soccer team from 1990 to 1994.  He was a team captain his senior year and finished his four-year career with a 41-27-8 record.  He was inducted into the Hartwick Athletic Hall of Fame in 1995.

Minor leagues
The Buffalo Blizzard of National Professional Soccer League drafted Kmosko in 1994, but he did not sign with them.  In 1995, he began his professional career with the USISL New York Fever where he earned Northeast Division Rookie of the Year.  That winter, he joined an NPSL team, the Cincinnati Silverbacks, not the Blizzard.

MLS

Colorado Rapids
In February 1996, the Colorado Rapids of Major League Soccer selected Kmosko in the 7th round (62nd overall) of the league's Inaugural Player Draft.  He spent the next two seasons with the Rapids.  However, at the end of the 1996 season, the Rapids loaned out Kmosko for two exhibition games.  On November 7, 1996, the team sent him to the Rapids farm team, the Raleigh Flyers (USISL), for an exhibition match with Trinidad and Tobago.  Later that month, the Rapids loaned him to fellow MLS team Dallas Burn for an exhibition match with the El Salvador national team.  In 1997, Kmosko was an integral part of the Rapids team which went to the MLS championship game where it lost 2-1 to D.C. United.  Kmosko started and played the entire game.

Miami Fusion
In 1997, MLS prepared to expand the number of teams in the league for the 1998 season.  As part of this process, the league ran an expansion draft. The Miami Fusion selected Kmosko with the eighteenth pick draft and he played twenty-nine games in 1998 with the Fusion.

Columbus Crew
The Mutiny traded Kmosko to the Columbus Crew for a first round 2000 MLS College Draft pick.  While Kmosko began the season well, playing in fourteen games, he suddenly and unexpectedly left the team.  The Crew waived Kmosko at the end of the season.  On February 24, 2000, the Mutiny selected Kmosko off waivers, but waived him on March 16, 2000.  There has been no official or public explanation for the end of Kmosko's playing career.

National team
Kmosko earned three caps with the U.S. national team while still in college.  His first game came in a scoreless tie with Costa Rica on February 12, 1992.  Six days later, he played in a 2-0 loss to El Salvador.  His last cap came on September 3, 1992 when he came on for Fernando Clavijo in a 2-0 win over Canada.

In 1993, he was a member of the U.S. team at the World University Games.

References

1972 births
Living people
Hartwick Hawks men's soccer players
United States men's international soccer players
USISL players
New York Fever players
National Professional Soccer League (1984–2001) players
Cincinnati Silverbacks players
Colorado Rapids players
Miami Fusion players
Columbus Crew players
People from Ship Bottom, New Jersey
Southern Regional High School alumni
Soccer players from New Jersey
Sportspeople from Ocean County, New Jersey
Major League Soccer players
American soccer players
Association football defenders